Roshon Gittens (born 5 February 2002) is a Barbadian footballer who plays as a midfielder for Ellerton FC of the Barbados Premier League, and the Barbados national team.

Club career
Gittens started off his career with Notre Dame SC before moving on to Ellerton FC in 2018. In April 2019 Gittens went on trial with FC DAC 1904 Dunajská Streda of the Slovakian Super Liga. In November 2020 he was scheduled to participate in trials in Europe again but was delayed because of the COVID-19 pandemic.

International career
Gittens represented Barbados at the youth level at the 2018 CONCACAF U-20 Championship and the 2019 CONCACAF U-17 Championship. He captained his side at the 2018 tournament. 

Gittens made his debut for the senior national team on 30 September 2018 in a friendly against Saint Vincent and the Grenadines at the age of 16. He was next called up to the senior squad for a friendly against Turks and Caicos on 19 March 2021. He went on to score his first senior international goal in the match, an eventual 2–0 victory. Two month later he was part of the Barbados squad for 2022 FIFA World Cup qualification but missed the matches through injury.

International goals
Scores and results list Barbados's goal tally first.

International career statistics

References

External links
 
 
Barbados FA profile

Living people
2002 births
Barbadian footballers
Barbados under-20 international footballers
Barbados youth international footballers
Association football forwards
Sportspeople from Bridgetown